Timothy Joseph Michael Graham (born 31 May 1939) is a former British track and field athlete who competed mainly in the 400 metres.

Athletics career
He competed for Great Britain in the 1964 Summer Olympics held in Tokyo, Japan in the 4 x 400 metre relay where he won the silver medal with his team mates Adrian Metcalfe, John Cooper and Robbie Brightwell.

He represented England and won a bronze medal in the 4 x 440 yards relay, at the 1966 British Empire and Commonwealth Games in Kingston, Jamaica.

Personal life
He later taught Art at Dr Morgan's Grammar School for Boys in Bridgwater Somerset, at King Edward VI School, Southampton, and at Ludlow Grammar School in Shropshire.

References

1939 births
Living people
English male sprinters
British male sprinters
Olympic athletes of Great Britain
Olympic silver medallists for Great Britain
Athletes (track and field) at the 1964 Summer Olympics
Commonwealth Games medallists in athletics
Athletes (track and field) at the 1966 British Empire and Commonwealth Games
Medalists at the 1964 Summer Olympics
Olympic silver medalists in athletics (track and field)
Commonwealth Games bronze medallists for England
Medallists at the 1966 British Empire and Commonwealth Games